George Henry Brown (May 22, 1877 – March 3, 1950) was a  politician who served as the  forty first, and forty seventh Mayor of Lowell, Massachusetts.

Brown was born on May 22, 1877, in Waterville, Maine.

Brown married Emma Vining on October 5, 1904, in Lowell, Massachusetts.

External links
 George H. Brown at Find A Grave

References

1877 births
Mayors of Lowell, Massachusetts
People from Waterville, Maine
Massachusetts Republicans
American military personnel of the Spanish–American War
American military personnel of the Philippine–American War
1950 deaths